Anthony Goodman may refer to:

 Anthony A. Goodman (born 1940), surgeon, academic and author
Anthony Goodman (historian) (1936–2016), English medieval historian

See also
Tony Goodman, American video game executive and entrepreneur